There have been seven baronetcies created for persons with the surname Russell, three in the Baronetage of England and four in the Baronetage of the United Kingdom.

The Russell baronetcy, of Wytley in the County of Worcester (i.e. Witley Court, Great Witley), was created in the Baronetage of England on 12 March 1627 for William Russell. He represented Worcestershire in the House of Commons. The second Baronet sat as Member of Parliament for Tewkesbury. The title became extinct on his death in 1705.

The Russell baronetcy, of Chippenham in the County of Cambridge, was created in the Baronetage of England on 19 January 1629 for William Russell. He represented Windsor in Parliament. The second Baronet sat as Member of Parliament for Cambridgeshire. The title is presumed to have become extinct on the death of the tenth Baronet in 1804.

The Russell baronetcy, of Langherne in the County of Carmarthen, was created in the Baronetage of England on 8 November 1660 for William Russell, a younger son of Sir William Russell of Chippenham. The title became extinct on his death in about 1714.

The Russell baronetcy, of Swallowfield in the County of Berkshire, was created in the Baronetage of the United Kingdom on 10 December 1812 for Henry Russell. He was Chief Justice of Bengal and was admitted to the Privy Council in 1816. The third Baronet represented Berkshire and Westminster in the House of Commons as a Conservative and was also awarded the Victoria Cross. The fourth Baronet sat as a Conservative Member of Parliament for East Berkshire. The sixth Baronet was a noted mineralogist. The presumed seventh Baronet never successfully proved his succession and was never on the Official Roll of the Baronetage. As a consequence, the presumed eighth and present Baronet has not proved his succession and is not on the Official Roll of the Baronetage, with the baronetcy considered dormant since 1964.

The Russell baronetcy, of Charlton Park in the County of Gloucester, was created in the Baronetage of the United Kingdom on 9 April 1832 for William Russell. The second Baronet represented Dover and Norwich in the House of Commons. The title became extinct on the death of the third Baronet in 1915.

The Russell baronetcy, of Littleworth Corner in Burnham in the County of Buckingham, was created in the Baronetage of the United Kingdom on 18 January 1916 for Charles Russell, a senior partner in the firm of Charles Russell and Co, solicitors. He was the second son of Charles Russell, Baron Russell of Killowen, the elder brother of Frank Russell, Baron Russell of Killowen, and the uncle of Charles Ritchie Russell, Baron Russell of Killowen. The baronetcy was created with remainder, failing heirs male of the grantee, to the heirs male of his father, one of whom is Lord Mayor William Russell, great-great-nephew of the 1st baronet.

The Russell baronetcy, of Olney in the County of Dublin, was created in the Baronetage of the United Kingdom on 20 June 1917 for Thomas Wallace Russell, for many years Member of Parliament for Tyrone South and Tyrone North. The title became extinct on his death in 1920.

Russell baronets, of Wytley (1627)
Sir William Russell, 1st Baronet (–1669)
Sir Francis Russell, 2nd Baronet (c. 1638–1706)

Russell baronets, of Chippenham (1629)

Sir William Russell, 1st Baronet (died 1654)
Sir Francis Russell, 2nd Baronet (c. 1616–1664)
Sir John Russell, 3rd Baronet (1640–1669)
Sir William Russell, 4th Baronet (died 1707)
Sir William Russell, 5th Baronet (died 1738)
Sir Francis Russell, 6th Baronet (died c. 1750)
Sir William Russell, 7th Baronet (died 1757)
Sir John Russell, 8th Baronet (1741–1783)
Sir John Russell, 9th Baronet (1777–1802)
Sir George Russell, 10th Baronet (1780–1804)

Russell baronets, of Langherne (1660)
Sir William Russell, 1st Baronet (died c. 1714)

Russell baronets, of Swallowfield (1812)
Sir Henry Russell, 1st Baronet (1751–1836)
Sir Henry Russell, 2nd Baronet (1783–1852)
Sir Charles Russell, 3rd Baronet (1826–1883)
Sir George Russell, 4th Baronet (1828–1898)
Sir George Arthur Charles Russell, 5th Baronet (1868–1944)
Sir Arthur Edward Ian Montagu Russell, 6th Baronet (1878–1964)
(Sir) George Michael Russell, 7th Baronet (1908–1993) (did not formally establish his right to the title)
(Sir) Arthur Mervyn Russell, 8th Baronet (1923–2010)
(Sir) Stephen Charles Russell, presumed 9th Baronet (born 1949) (has not formally established his claim to the title)

The heir presumptive to the baronetcy is the 9th and present baronet's half-brother, Ian Mervyn Russell (born 1956).

Russell baronets, of Charlton Park (1832)
Sir William Russell, 1st Baronet (1773–1839)
Sir William Russell, 2nd Baronet (1822–1892)
Sir William Russell, 3rd Baronet (1865–1915)

Russell baronets, of Littleworth Corner (1916)
Sir Charles Russell, 1st Baronet (1863–1928)
Sir Alec Charles Russell, 2nd Baronet, MC (1894–1938)
Sir Charles Ian Russell, 3rd Baronet (1918–1997)
Sir Charles Dominic Russell, 4th Baronet (born 1956)<ref>[http://www.debretts.com/people-of-today/profile/3243/Charles-Dominic-RUSSELL Debrett's People of Today]</ref>

The heir apparent to the baronetcy is the 4th and present baronet's son, Charles William Russell (born 1988).

Russell baronets, of Olney (1917)
Sir Thomas Wallace Russell, 1st Baronet (1841–1920)

 See also 
Russell (surname)
Duke of Bedford
Baronet

 References 

 Notes 
Kidd, Charles & Williamson, David (editors). Debrett's Peerage and Baronetage'' (1990 edition). New York: St Martin's Press, 1990

External links
 www.burkespeerage.com
 

Baronetcies in the Baronetage of the United Kingdom
Extinct baronetcies in the Baronetage of the United Kingdom
Baronetcies created with special remainders
Russell family